, commonly referred to as , is a Japanese manga series written and illustrated by two people under the pseudonym Nico Tanigawa. It began serialization on Square Enix's Gangan Online service from August 4, 2011 and is published by Yen Press in North America. A 4-panel spin-off manga was serialized in Gangan Joker between January 2013 and July 2015. An anime television adaptation by Silver Link aired in Japan between July and September 2013.

Plot
Fifteen-year-old Tomoko Kuroki believed that she would become popular upon entering high school because she has become well-versed in the world of otome games. In reality, she finds that she has become an unsociable loner, though she still forces herself to try out what she has learned about achieving popularity. As she progresses through high school, Tomoko attempts to improve her social status among her peers.

Characters

Main characters

Tomoko is depicted as a desperate, lonely girl who is characterized by her social anxiety, vivid facial expressions, and bags under her eyes. She has a grim outlook on life, as most of her thoughts involve insulting others or herself. She spends most of her days playing otome games and browsing the web. In her third year of high school, she decides that she wants to be a novelist.

Tomoko's gloomy younger brother. One year younger than Tomoko. He is often annoyed by her odd behavior, and sometimes gets into fights with her. Because he has friends and is a talented soccer player, Tomoko occasionally intrudes upon his room for advice on making friends.

Yū is Tomoko's best friend since second year of junior high school. Initially a dorky-looking girl, she enters  with newfound blonde hair. After her radical makeover and having a boyfriend, with whom she later breaks up, she continues to regard Tomoko as her best friend. She is the star of the 4-panel spin-off manga. She later befriends Tomoko's classmates and schoolmates during a summer study camp in their third year. She is aiming to enter the same school as Tomoko, Aoyama Gakuin University.

 Tomoko's classmate from the second year to third year and friend, although on occasion they have more romantic interactions. Yuri is often seen with Yoshida and Mako. Often silent and gloomy, she gets upset whenever Tomoko gets along with other people. Tomoko believes that she is a covert pervert, based on how Yuri was interested in reading an ecchi manga on a platform introduced to her by Tomoko. She is also shown to be very strong.

Tomoko's classmate from first year to third year and friend who secretly wants to become a voice actress. Initially considered part of the popular crowd, she becomes more open with her true otaku nature after Tomoko learns of her dream. Tomoko discovers that she is actually innocent with regards to matters of sexuality despite teasing Akane about it. Hina and Yuri have a friendly rivalry, with each competing to outdo the other in getting closer to Tomoko.

Tomoko's classmate from second year to third year and friend. She is a stylish gyaru who is kind towards Tomoko, who admires her as a motherly figure. Like Tomoko, she aspires to enroll in Aoyama Gakuen University.

Tomoko's family

Tomoko and Tomoki's mother, who is often concerned about her daughter's well-being.

 

Tomoko's little cousin who is three years younger than her. Initially looking up to Tomoko as a big sister, she later begins to pity her after she realizes she lies just to impress her. She is described by Tomoko as a "psychopath", as while she was emotional as a young child she later becomes deadpan and overtly emotional around Tomoko, and emotionless around most other people.

Tomoko and Tomoki's father, who is a salaryman.

Harajuku High School

The kind-hearted former student council president at Tomoko's school, who has shown the most affection towards Tomoko. She is now a freshman at Aoyama Gakuen University. She is the owner of the dog .

Tomoko and Yuu's classmate in second year of junior high school, who first appears in the spin-off manga and is later revealed to be attending Tomoko's high school. She and Tomoko outright dislike one another, only pretending to get along when Yuu is around. She has a disturbing crush on Tomoki and is obsessed with the Chiba Lotte Marines baseball team. Tomoko's classmate in third year of high school.

Tomoko's classmate from the second year to third year and friend who has a scary appearance and is often referred to as a delinquent by Tomoko. She often acts violently towards Tomoko when she goes too far but also likes cute things. Like Akane and Hina, she is shown to be innocent when it comes to sex-related subjects.

Tomoko's classmate from the second year to third year and friend who is also Yuri's best friend. She is generally kind-hearted, though a misunderstanding causes Tomoko to believe she's a lesbian.

Tomoko's classmate in second year, nicknamed  by her friends, who becomes increasingly conscious of Tomoko's behavior and eventually develops an obsession with her. She is often noted for having an expression like an emoji and for appearing out of nowhere.

Hina's best friend who has a distinguishing hairstyle. Tomoko's classmate from first year to third year. She initially had reservations about Hina's aspirations to become a voice actress, but quickly accepts it, thanks to Tomoko's indirect help.

Tomoko's classmate from second year to third year. A girl with a fanged appearance who is friends with Mako and often speaks badly of Tomoko. She develops an uneasy friendship with Shiki after a falling-out with Sachi and her clique.

Kotomi's best friend, who is often bewildered by her creepier moments. She is good at observing other people. Tomoko's classmate in third year.

One of Asuka's friends in another class. She has a strange curiosity with Asuka and Tomoko's interactions with one another, bordering on obsession. Tomoko nicknames her "Sleazy Maiden" and "Gorilla" because of her rather intrusive questions. Fuuka often attempts to one up on Tomoko by showing off her shallow knowledge of sex, which backfires dues to her inexperience. As a result, she is the subject of many rumors circulated around the school and is labeled an "idiot" by Miho.

Asuka and Fuuka's friend. She is a cheerful and playful girl who likes teasing Fuuka and Tomoko.

A girl in Tomoko's school who is in love with Tomoki, but constantly has her reputation bashed by Tomoko.

Akari's best friend whose attempts at pairing Akari up with Tomoki prove to do more harm than good. She likes Nakamura, her classmate and a member of the soccer club.

 and 
Masaki's friends in her "delinquent" clique.

Nicknamed "Emoji Mk.II" by Tomoko, she is Tomoko's classmate and friend during their third year. Shiki dreams to be a professional gamer and a streamer.

A first-year student in Tomoko's third year who admires Tomoko for helping her pass her entrance exams. She has trouble making female friends because her female classmates envy her popularity with boys.

One of Koharu's friends, who enjoys talking behind people's backs and is largely responsible for Koharu's behavior. She seems to have an interest in Tomoki.

Tomoko's eccentric homeroom teacher who often encourages her to make friends, much to her chagrin.

Media

Manga
Written by two people under the pseudonym Nico Tanigawa, WataMote began serialization on Square Enix's Gangan Online service from August 4, 2011. The first tankōbon volume was released on January 21, 2012, with 22 volumes and an official fan book released as of September 21, 2013, . An anthology was released on June 22, 2013, . The second volume, released on May 22, 2012, ranked #10 in the Oricon charts in its opening week. As of July 2013, the series has printed over 1.5 million copies. The manga gained popularity overseas after fan translations of the series were posted on the English speaking imageboard 4chan, the Western equivalent of Japan's Futaba Channel. Yen Press has licensed the manga in North America and the UK and began releasing the series from October 29, 2013. A novel anthology written by Nico Tanigawa, Masaki Tsuji, Yugo Aosaki, Sako Aizawa and Van Madoy was released on November 15, 2019, .

In the Yen Press English version, individual chapters are called "Fails" and are preceded with the title "I'm Not Popular, So".

Anime
An anime television adaptation of the manga was announced to have been greenlit in an advertising for the third manga volume on December 20, 2012. The television series was produced by Silver Link and aired in Japan between July 8 and September 23, 2013, while Crunchyroll simulcast the series for North America. The series is directed by Shin Oonuma and written by Takao Yoshioka, with character design by Hideki Furukawa. An original video animation episode was released with the seventh manga volume on October 22, 2014. Sentai Filmworks licensed the series in North America and released it on Blu-ray and DVD on August 26, 2014.

It charted at #79 in Japan.

Production credits

Series director: Shin Oonuma
Series writer: Takao Yoshioka
Producer: Aimi Watanabe
Producer: Atsushi Aitani
Producer: Hayato Kaneko
Producer: Kaho Yamada
Producer: Makoto Ito
Producer: Masatoshi Ishizuka
Producer: Sun Hye Moon
Producer: Toshiaki Tanaka
Chief animation director: Hideki Furukawa
Character design: Hideki Furukawa
Art director: Maki Morio (of Studio Uni)
Composer: Narasaki and Watchman (as Sadesper Record)
Music producer: Kazuo Shinohara
Photography director: Kazuya Iwai (of Studio Shamrock)
3D director: Toshirō Hamamura (of Studio Shamrock)
Editor: Kentarō Tsubone
Sound director: Satoshi Motoyama
Sound effects: Tsutomu Ueno

Episode list
{|class="wikitable" style="width:98%; margin:auto; background:#FFF;"
|- style="border-bottom: 3px solid #CCF;"
! style="width:3em;" |No.
! Title
! style="width:17em;"| Directed and storyboarded by
! style="width:10em;"| Written by
! style="width:9em;"| Original airdate
|-

{{Episode list
| EpisodeNumber   = OVA
| Title           = Since I'm Not Popular, I'll Become an Enigma
| AltTitle        = Motenai shi, Nazomeitemiru
| RAltTitle       =  ()
| DirectedBy      = Yoshinobu Tokumoto
| WrittenBy       = Takao Yoshioka
| OriginalAirDate = 
| ShortSummary    = Tomoko discusses with Yuu and Kii on how to make Watamote'''s second season a success, only to be informed that it's highly unlikely. During middle school, a boy named Aomatsu had an encounter with a mysterious girl on the school rooftop. However, this is revealed to simply be Tomoko playing around.
}}
|}

ReceptionWataMote has been the subject of much discussion and debate, particularly in its depiction of social anxiety and the main character Tomoko. Many have debated if the series is a comedy or a study of neurosis with many varying opinions on whether the subject matter is supposed to be humorous or not. Still, the anime adaptation has been highly praised by most websites, particularly for its main character Tomoko, and Izumi Kitta's portrayal of her. Among the most praised aspects of the series, the opening title sequence has received unanimous praise for its opening song, visuals, and how well it represents Tomoko's loneliness, frustration, and intense social anxiety.

Kotaku contributor and anime critic Richard Eisenbeis gave the series an extremely negative review, describing the show as being the "most mean-spirited" anime that he had ever viewed as a critic and fan. He criticized the show's main source of humor, the protagonist's social anxiety disorder, as being low-brow and demeaning to the mentally ill.

On the other hand, Anime News Network's review compared the series to other well-known series dealing with subject of social misfits, such as Welcome to the NHK and Genshiken. Furthermore, Tomoko is portrayed as a completely anti-moe character, since she is angry and vengeful, instead of a typical cheery moe girl who just happens to be socially clumsy. The review praises the series for being insightful and straightforward in its treatment of social maladjustment.

 Explanatory notes 

References
 No Matter How I Look at It, It’s You Guys' Fault I'm Not Popular!'' manga volumes by Nico Tanigawa. Original Japanese version published by Square Enix. English version published by Yen Press.

 
 
 
 
 
 
 

 Other references

External links
Official manga website at Square Enix 
Official anime website 

2011 manga
2013 anime television series debuts
2013 Japanese television series endings
2014 anime OVAs
Anime series based on manga
Dark comedy anime and manga
Gangan Comics manga
Gangan Online manga
Japanese webcomics
Shōnen manga
Sentai Filmworks
Silver Link
Slice of life anime and manga
TV Tokyo original programming
Webcomics in print
Yen Press titles